Dufferin—Caledon is a federal electoral district in Ontario, Canada, that has been represented in the House of Commons of Canada since 2004.

It was created in 2003 from parts of Dufferin—Peel—Wellington—Grey riding.

This riding gained a fraction of territory from Vaughan during the 2012 electoral redistribution.

After David Tilson's resignation, in March 2019 the Dufferin—Caledon nomination for the Conservative Party in the 2019 election was won by Harzadan Singh Khattra, amid accusations within the party of vote tampering, membership reimbursement, and payments to foreign students to attend, despite their ineligibility within party rules.

Member of Parliament

Election results

See also
 List of Canadian federal electoral districts
 Past Canadian electoral districts

References

 Electoral results from Parliament of Canada website
2011 Results from Elections Canada
 Campaign expense data from Elections Canada

Notes

External links
 Website of the Parliament of Canada

Ontario federal electoral districts
Caledon, Ontario
Orangeville, Ontario